The Bellevue funicular, in Meudon, Hauts-de-Seine department, was from 1893 to 1934 a funicular running from the Bellevue-Funiculaire station on the Coteaux line (today, Brimborion), to the Gare de Bellevue, on the Paris–Brest railway line.

Description 

After being permitted to cross the Coteaux line, the lower station was raised  to connect with the route from Vaugirard (Bas Meudon), thus requiring passengers to climb a staircase, clearly seen on the left of the station.

With a constant gradient of 16° 56' (about 30%), it was entirely built on a viaduct of twelve metal sections, resting on five lattice pillars  and two masonry abutments with a foundation of solid brick. A passing loop was provided in the middle of the route. Safety brakes were provided by a rack rail.

Traction was provided by two fixed  steam engines, though only one was used in normal conditions. The weight of the ascending carriage would be partly counterbalanced by that of the other descending. The journey took between one-and-a-half and two minutes.

Operation needed at least four people: two drivers (one for each car), a mechanic and a boilerman for the steam engine.

History 
In 1891, two businessmen from Meudon (Gabriel Thomas and Paul Houette, a local councillor), agreed to build a funicular to connect the Seine to the heights of Meudon and so to give walkers access to the Forest of Meudon.

In 1893, a line opened connecting the two railway stations and the steamboats on the river. At the start of its operation, the line worked with a departure every five minutes from 7 am until 7:30 pm in winter, and from 6 am until 10:45 pm in summer. The fares for ascent were 20 centimes on Sundays and holidays and 10 centimes on other days; descent cost 10 centimes at all times. In the first twenty months of operation, passengers numbered .

Nevertheless, the line made a considerable loss in the winter season; the service was soon curtailed to the summer season, from 1 April until November. In 1895, the funicular transported  passengers and  bicycles. But the deficit was still  francs and a grant of  francs was requested from the Commune of Meudon, which the municipal council rejected on 5 May 1895.

From 1917 until Easter 1922 the line was inactive, following the mobilization of personnel for the First World War. In 1923, the funicular transported  passengers. But in 1932 the chronic losses of the line forced services to be cut to Sundays only. The line had only  passengers in 1934, and it was finally decided to abandon the line in 1938. After a period of rail adhesion trials with a horizontal wheel gripping a central rail, the infrastructure was totally dismantled after the Second World War.

Future projects 
Since 2005, a new Bellevue funicular project has been proposed. The RATP carried out a feasibility study concerned with creating public transport in reserved lanes connecting two  of Meudon: Meudon-sur-Seine (on Paris Tramway Line 2) and Meudon Bellevue (Transilien station). Although the intention is to resurrect the funicular for the 21st century, its route and technology will be very different. The aim is to allow the residents of the Meudon heights more easy access to:
 The industrial areas of Meudon-sur-Seine and the future industrial areas of Boulogne-Billancourt, via the future Tramway Meudon - Boulogne - Saint-Cloud;
 Paris and La Défense, via Paris Tramway Line 2.

As of the end of 2008, this project remained very uncertain and nothing definite had been said about its eventual construction or financing.

Old postcards

A model of the funicular is exhibited at the Meudon Museum of Art and History.

References

Sources

External links 

 
 Postcards of the Bellevue funicular

Funicular railways in France
Rail transport in Paris
Defunct funicular railways
Railway lines opened in 1893
Railway lines closed in 1934